Helen Lowry College of Arts & Commerce, Aizawl, is a college run by the Mizo Conference of Seventh-day Adventist  in Mizoram, India. It is a part of the Seventh-day Adventist education system, the world's second-largest Christian school and college system.
It was inaugurated as college on 23 August 2017 by the Chief Minister of Mizoram Lalthanhawla.

History
Helen Lowry School was opened on 17 January 1950, in the bungalow of the District Superintendent which is now the residence of the Governor of Mizoram. The school, which started off with ten students, reached the highest enrolment of 756 students in 1990. The school was started by Mrs. Helen Lowry, wife of glass artist Willis G. Lowry while they were working as Seventh-day Adventist missionaries in Mizoram.

In 1956, the Assam section of SDA permitted an extension up to class VII. In 1975, the Northeast India Section of SDA (Assam Section) recognized HLS, from Nursery to VII. In 1977, the Southern Asia Division of Seventh-day Adventists recognized HLS as Junior High school with its classes extending to class VII. In 1981, the Division recognized HLS as a full-fledge high school. 1976, the Government of Mizoram recognized the school as a junior High School; that is up to class VIII. In 1980, the Education Department of Mizoram recognized it as a full fledge high school (up to Class-10). The Mizoram Board of School Education (MBSE) recognized the school as a full-fledge high school. On 26 June 2000, Director of School Education, Government of Mizoram, allowed the school to function for Arts stream as a higher secondary school.
Helen Lowry Higher Secondary School was further upgraded to Helen Lowry College of Arts & Commerce on 23 August 2017.

Facilities
There are physics, chemistry and biology laboratories. The college has a basketball court and a volleyball court.

Accreditation
Both the elementary and high school programs are fully accredited with the Mizoram Board of School Education. The college is accredited to Mizoram University.

Degree Courses 
The college offers education in the following courses
Bachelor of Commerce
Bachelor of Arts

Spiritual aspects
All students take religion classes each year that they are enrolled. These classes cover topics in biblical history and Christian and denominational doctrines. Instructors in other disciplines also begin each class period with prayer or a short devotional thought, many which encourage student input. Weekly, the entire student body gathers together in the auditorium for an hour-long chapel service.
Outside the classrooms there is year-round spiritually oriented programming that relies on student involvement.

Athletics
The Academy offers the following sports:
Basketball 
Football
Volleyball

See also

 List of Seventh-day Adventist secondary and elementary schools
 List of Seventh-day Adventist colleges and universities

References

External links 
 Lowry College

Universities and colleges in Mizoram
Colleges affiliated to Mizoram University
Education in Aizawl
Adventist universities and colleges in India
Universities and colleges affiliated with the Seventh-day Adventist Church